Bozoum is the capital of Ouham-Pendé, one of the 14 prefectures of the Central African Republic.

History 
On 13 January 2014 Seleka withdrew from Bozoum. Anti-balaka took control of the town. Muslims who lived there were subjects to threats by militiamen. In March 2017 Anti-balakas disarmed peacekeepers who tried to enter Bozoum.

In March 2019 it was reported that Bozoum was under control of the government with armed forces being deployed there to protect Chinese companies operating in the area.

On 19 November 2020 government forces withdrew from Bozoum and month later on 18 December it was captured by rebels from Coalition of Patriots for Change. It was recaptured by government forces on 25 February 2021.

Climate 
Köppen-Geiger climate classification system classifies its climate as tropical wet and dry (Aw).

See also 
 List of cities in the Central African Republic
 Prefectures of the Central African Republic

References 

Sub-prefectures of the Central African Republic
Populated places in Ouham-Pendé